Between War and Peace may refer to:
Between War and Peace: The Potsdam Conference, a 1960 book by Herbert Feis
Between War and Peace: Lessons from Afghanistan and Iraq, a 2004 book by Victor Davis Hanson

See also
War and Peace